Georges (George) Emile Léonard Theunis (28 February 1873 – 4 January 1966) was the prime minister of Belgium from 16 December 1921 to 13 May 1925 and again from 20 November 1934 to 25 March 1935. He was governor of the National Bank of Belgium (NBB) from 1941 until 1944. He was the minister of Finance from 1920 to 1925.

Theunis received a military training and was also trained as an engineer. Georges Theunis started his career in the Empain group, where he was an administrator and later the president of the board of ACEC. During World War I, he headed the Belgian Wartime Provisions Commission in London. After the war he was involved in the Paris Peace Conference, 1919 and served as the Belgian delegate to the Reparations Commission. From 1926 until 1927 he chaired the International Economic Conference in Geneva.

In 1926 Theunis joined the newly formed council of regency of the National Bank, together with Emile Francqui, and remained a member until the war, except for two breaks during his ministerial duties. As regents of the NBB, both Theunis and Francqui represented the power which the large private banks had gained since 1926. During World War II he served as a special ambassador to the United States of America. In 1941, he was appointed governor of the National Bank of Belgium by the Pierlot government in exile at London instead of Albert Goffin who had been appointed by Secretary General Charles Plisnier. On his return to Belgium after the war, he resigned as governor of the NBB.

Honours 
 : Minister of State, by Royal Decree.
 : Grand Cordon in the Order of Leopold
 : Grand Cross of the Order of the White Lion
 : knight Grand Cross Legion of Honour
 : Order of Saint Michael and Saint George
 Grand Cross in the Order of Saint Gregory the Great, 1932.

References

Sources
Georges Theunis on the site of the Belgian Federal Government
Georges Theunis
A tribute to America, the U.S.A. at war as seen through Belgian eyes  A speech by Theunis

External links
 

|-

|-

1873 births
1966 deaths
People from Saint-Nicolas, Liège
Catholic Party (Belgium) politicians
Finance ministers of Belgium
Prime Ministers of Belgium
Belgian Ministers of State
Governors of the National Bank of Belgium
Belgian civil servants
Belgian Ministers of Defence
Grand Crosses of the Order of the White Lion